The Cape Flattery class is a class of four torpedo trials craft in the United States Navy. All active craft are currently assigned to the Naval Undersea Warfare Center in Keyport, Washington.

Ships in class

References

Auxiliary ships of the United States
1989 ships
1990 ships
Auxiliary ship classes of the United States Navy